A broad range of food production-distribution-consumption configurations can be characterised as short food supply chain (SFSCs), such as farmers' markets, farm shops, collective farmers' shops, community-supported agriculture and solidarity purchase groups. More generally, a food supply chain can be defined as "short" when it is characterized by short physical distance or involvement of few intermediaries between producers and consumers.

Origin of the concept 
SFSCs were originally identified as examples of "resistance" of farmers to modernization of the food system, characterized by the development of supply chains based on long-distance trade. Resistance consists in the fact that, by selling directly to consumers, farmers bypass intermediaries and thus can develop autonomous marketing strategies based on differentiation. These strategies give farmers the possibility of keeping a bigger share of the value added within the farm and within the local economies. Given these characteristics, short food supply chains are increasingly taken into consideration by rural and food policies as a driver of change in the food system and a policy tool for rural development.

The analysis of short food supply chains has fed a broader debate on "alternative food chains", "alternative food networks", and "sustainable food chains".

Specificity 
SFSCs are considered the most appropriate channels for organic and locally specific products and for small farmers. In fact, a closer relation between producers and consumers gives producers the opportunity to develop a richer communication, and to identify market niches. Ilbery and Maye state, "the crucial characteristic of SFSCs is that foods which reach the final consumer have been transmitted through an SC that is 'embedded' with value-laden information concerning the mode of production, provenance, and distinctive quality assets of the product". Likewise, Marsden et al. (2000) state that "a common characteristic, however, is the emphasis upon the type of relationship between the producer and the consumer in these supply chains, and the role of this relationship in constructing value and meaning, rather than solely the type of product itself".

Dimensions of proximity 
In order to develop a definition of SFSCs, there are a number of candidate criteria that may be used. SFSCs have been conceptualized in terms of Dimensions of Proximity. Kebir and Torre (2012) were perhaps some of the first to propose such a conceptualization, classifying SFSCs based on two dimensions: Geographical Proximity and "Organized" Proximity, the latter of which incorporates social notions of Belonging and Similarity. Other dimensions have been proposed, including: 
 Geographical proximity: physically close, and is measured as a distance between producers and consumers.
 Social proximity: expression is direct (with very few intermediaries) and trustful relations between a producer and consumer who know each other and the product, solidarity between producers and consumers, civic engagement in local food system, (re)connection with local food traditions and identities.
 Economic proximity: market exchanges happen and money circulates within a community or a certain locality (owned and governed locally, transparent, and traceable)

Classification
SFSCs are classified by Renting et al. as face-to-face, proximate, or extended. Face to face are characterized by physical encounters between producers and consumers (as in the case of farmers' markets). In the proximate short food supply chains, producers do not necessarily engage in product distribution (as in the case of consumers' cooperatives). In the extended short food supply chains, although geographical distances between producers and consumers may be long, consumers are aware of the identity of the producers and of the products (such as in the case of fair trade and protected denominations of origin).

Regulations 
A French action plan developed in 2009 at the Ministry of Agriculture, Agrifood, and Forestry was aimed at supporting the development of short food chains (les circuits courts de commercialisation des produits agricoles). According to the plan, short food chains are defined on the base of the number of actors involved. SFSC are considered as "commercialisation of agricultural products through direct selling or indirect selling when only one intermediary is involved". (« Un circuit court est un mode de commercialisation des produits agricoles qui s'exerce soit par la vente directe du producteur au consommateur, soit par la vente indirecte à condition qu'il n'y ait qu'un seul intermédiaire. »)

However, there have been discussions at the senate and at regional levels that shortness should not be reduced to the number of intermediaries but also geographical distance should be considered (e.g., one can buy vine directly, but what if it travels 1,000 km?). Following the national action plan (or maybe prior to it in some cases), regional SFSC plans have been developed. Regional action plans refer to the definition above, but they also complement or precise it. F.i. Aquitaine region also adds short or reduced geographical distance between producers and consumers  (link).
The French Law on modernisation of agriculture and fishing, updated in 2010 (n° 2010-874), among its many other intervention actions also states "the development of short food chains and facilitation of geographical proximity between producers and processors."

Examples

Farmers' markets are physical retail markets featuring foods sold directly by farmers to consumers. There may be controls intended to ensure that sellers and products are local as well as excluding intermediaries: for example, Guildford Borough Council states that producers using their Farmers' Market "must be based in our catchment area of within [a] 50 mile radius of Guildford", although they do also state that "occasionally we will take a producer outside the catchment, but only if it's a product that can't be sourced within the radius".

Community-supported agriculture (CSA), network or association of individuals who have pledged to support one or more local farms, with growers and consumers sharing the risks and benefits of food production. The URGENCI network federates initiatives of CSA from all over the world.

Gruppi di acquisto solidale (GAS) Italian networks initiated by consumers that link up to farmers to organize alternative food provision.

AMAP (French Associations pour le maintien d'une agriculture paysanne) support peasant and organic agriculture through direct links between farmers and consumers

Food hubs aggregate, distribute and market food from farmers to consumers.

Research projects
 GLAMUR - Global and local food assessment: a multidimensional performance-based approach
 FOODLINKS - Knowledge brokerage to promote sustainable food consumption and production: linking scientists, policymakers, and civil society organisations
 SUS-CHAINS - Marketing sustainable agriculture: an analysis of the potential role of new food supply chains in sustainable rural development
 PUREFOOD - is a Marie Curie Initial Training Network funded by the European Commission's Seventh Framework PEOPLE program. The objective of PUREFOOD is to train a pool of early-stage researchers in the socio-economic and socio-spatial dynamics of the (peri-)urban and regional foodscape
 SMARTCHAIN - is a Horizon 2020 funded project aiming to further support the development of collaborative short food supply chains and promote a more favourable framework for sustainable, local, healthier and ethically produced food in Europe

See also
 Alternative food systems

References

External links 

Short Food Supply Chains and Local Food Systems in the EU. A State of Play of their Socio-Economic Characteristics. a publication of the Joint Research Centre of the European Commission
 Short Food Supply Chains as drivers of sustainable development. Evidence Document. This document is the result of a joint collaboration among practitioners, policy makers and scientists who joined in the Short Food Supply Chains Community of Practice, established within the Foodlinks project (in the framework of the FP7 project FOODLINKS GA No. 265287)

Food politics
Supply chain management
Food retailing
Sustainable food system